Devora Halter Keidar (born 8 June 1924) is an Israeli actress. 

Dvora Kedar was born in Poland. She began her acting career in Habima, Israel's National Theatre. In 1964, she appeared in her first movie, Ulai terdu sham. In 1977, she starred in Mivtza Yonatan, in 1979, she appeared in Lemon Popsicle as Benji's mother. Nikmato Shel Itzik Finkelstein was her last movie, although she continues to act in Israeli theatre productions  She has two children and four grandchildren.

Kedar won the Ophir Award for Best Actress in a Supporting Role.

Filmography 

 Fire Birds (2015) - Mrs. Halperin
 Zaguri (TV Series 2014–2015) - Masuda
 Ha-Seret Shelanu (2005) - Benzi Mother
 Itche (TV Series 1994)
 The Revenge of Itzik Finkelstein (1993) - Mother
 Summertime Blues (1988) - Benjy's Mother
 Up Your Anchor (1985) - Sonja
 Baby Love (1983) - Sonja
 Private Popsicle (1982) - Sonja
 Hot Bubblegum (1981) - Sonja, Benjy's Mother
 Going Steady (1979) - Sonja
 Lemon Popsicle (1978) - Sonja
 Operation Thunderbolt (1977) - Freda-Ben David
 A Gift from Heaven (1973)
 The Dreamer (1970) - Mother
 The Prodigal Son (1968)
 Dreamboat (1963) - Mother
 One Hundred and One Dalmatians (1961) - Nanny (Israeli version)

References 

1924 births
Living people
20th-century Israeli actresses
Ophir Award Winners
Israeli film actresses
Israeli stage actresses
Lithuanian emigrants to Israel
People from Vilnius
Actresses from Vilnius